Two general elections were held in the Republic of Ireland in 1982:

February 1982 Irish general election
November 1982 Irish general election